The Domesday Book of 1086 lists in the following order the tenants-in-chief in Devonshire of King William the Conqueror:
Osbern FitzOsbern (died 1103), Bishop of Exeter
Geoffrey de Montbray (died 1093), Bishop of Coutances
Glastonbury Church, Somerset
Tavistock Church, Devon
Buckfast Church, Devon
Horton Church, Dorset
Cranborne Church, Dorset
Battle Church, Sussex
St Mary's Church, Rouen, Normandy
Mont Saint-Michel Church, Normandy
St Stephen's Church, Caen, Normandy
Holy Trinity Church, Caen
Hugh d'Avranches, 1st Earl of Chester (died 1101)
Robert, Count of Mortain (died 1090), half-brother of the king
Baldwin de Moels (died 1090), Sheriff of Devon, feudal baron of Okehampton,
Juhel de Totnes (died 1123/30), feudal baron of Totnes, Devon
William de Mohun (died post 1090), feudal baron of Dunster, Somerset
William Cheever, (Latinised to Capra, "she-goat"), feudal baron of Bradninch, Devon. He was brother of Ralph de Pomeroy (see below), feudal baron of Berry Pomeroy Devon
William de Falaise, feudal baron of Stogursey, Somerset
William de Poilley, whose lands later formed part of the Feudal barony of Plympton
William II, Count of Eu (died 1097)
Walter of Douai (died c. 1107), Feudal baron of Bampton, Devon
Walter de Claville, brother of Gotshelm; his lands later formed part of the Feudal barony of Gloucester
Gotshelm, brother of Walter de Claville; his lands later formed part of the Feudal barony of Gloucester
Richard fitz Gilbert (died c. 1090), elder brother of Baldwin de Moels, Sheriff of Devon, feudal baron of Okehampton,
Roger de Busli (died c. 1099)
Robert of Aumale (Latinised to de Albemarle); his lands later formed part of the Feudal barony of Plympton
Robert Bastard, whose lands later formed part of the Feudal barony of Plympton
Richard Fitz Turold (died post 1103-6) (alias fitzThorold, fitzTurolf), whose lands later formed part of the Feudal barony of Cardinham, Cornwall
Ralph de Limesy, most of his Devon manors passed to the Feudal barony of Bradninch 
Ralph Pagnell
Ralph de Feugeres
Ralph de Pomeroy, feudal baron of Berry Pomeroy, brother of William Cheever, feudal baron of Bradninch
Roald Dubbed, whose lands later formed part of the Feudal barony of Plympton
Theobald FitzBerner, whose lands later formed part of the Feudal barony of Great Torrington. He was the father-in-law of Odo FitzGamelin
Turstin FitzRolf, feudal baron of North Cadbury, Somerset
Alfred of Spain
Alfred the Breton
Ansger
Aiulf
Odo FitzGamelin, son-in-law of Theobald FitzBerner. His lands later formed part of the Feudal barony of Great Torrington. 
Osbern of Sacey
The wife of Hervey of Hellean
Gerald the Chaplain
Gerard
Godbold
Nicholas the Bowman (or "Nicholas the Gunner")
Fulchere ("Fulchere the Bowman"), most of his lands later became part of the feudal barony of Plympton
Haimeric
King's Servants
King's Thanes

See also
Cornwall Domesday Book tenants-in-chief

References

Sources
Thorn, Caroline & Frank, (eds.) Domesday Book, (Morris, John, gen. ed.) Vol. 9, Devon, Parts 1 & 2, Phillimore Press, Chichester, 1985, part 1, List of Landholders in Devon
Sanders, I. J. English Baronies: a Study of their Origin and Descent 1086-1327, Oxford, 1960